Plesiohadros (meaning "near to hadrosaurids") is an extinct genus of hadrosauroid dinosaur. It is known from a partial skeleton including the skull collected at Alag Teg locality, from the Campanian Alagteeg Formation of southern Mongolia. The type species is Plesiohadros djadokhtaensis.

Paleoecology
Plesiohadros is the only known hadrosaur from the Alagteeg Formation.

References

Late Cretaceous dinosaurs of Asia
Djadochta fauna
Iguanodonts
Fossil taxa described in 2014
Taxa named by David B. Weishampel
Ornithischian genera